Jetstream is a 2008 documentary television series produced by Paperny Films for the network Discovery Channel Canada.  The series totals 8 episodes and premiered on January 8, 2008. The series was narrated by Canadian actor Kavan Smith.

Seven of the eight pilots are graduates of the Royal Military College of Canada:

21810 Capt. Michael (Mike) "Floater" M.R. Lewis (RMC ‘00)
21955 Capt. Riel "Guns" K. Erickson (RMC ‘01);
22537 Capt. Yannick "Blow" Jobin (RMC ‘03);
22542 Capt. Tristan "T-bag" Mckee (RMC ‘03);
22715 Capt. Timothy (Tim) "Nail'n" B. Coffin (RMC ‘03);
22821 Lt. Dave "Tickler" McLeod (RMC ‘04);
22848 Capt. Shamus "Carney" T. Allen (RMC ‘04)

The series was released on DVD in 2008.

Synopsis
Jetstream follows eight pilots training with the Royal Canadian Air Force to fly one of the most advanced supersonic tactical fighter jets in the world—the CF-18 Hornet at CFB Cold Lake, Alberta. They train under the 410 Tactical Fighter Training Squadron.

Episodes

DVD
Jetstream was released on DVD in 2008.  The DVD box set includes all eight episodes of the series, over 20 minutes of bonus footage, and a preview for the TV series Combat School.

Footnotes

External links
 
 Official page for Jetstream at Paperny Films site
 Official Jetstream site
 Toronto Star article about Peterborough, Ontario baby named after Captain Riel Erickson

2008 Canadian television series debuts
2008 Canadian television series endings
2000s Canadian reality television series
Discovery Channel (Canada) original programming
Documentary television series about aviation
English-language television shows